The 52nd New York State Legislature, consisting of the New York State Senate and the New York State Assembly, met from January 6 to May 5, 1829, during the short tenure of Martin Van Buren as Governor of New York, and—after Van Buren's resignation—during the first year of Enos T. Throop's governorship, in Albany.

Background
Under the provisions of the New York Constitution of 1821, 32 Senators were elected on general tickets in eight senatorial districts for four-year terms. They were divided into four classes, and every year eight Senate seats came up for election. Assemblymen were elected countywide on general tickets to a one-year term, the whole Assembly being renewed annually.

On January 31, 1828, a caucus of Jacksonian legislators nominated Andrew Jackson for U.S. president.

State Senator Charles H. Carroll resigned in March 1828, leaving a vacancy in the Eighth District.

On June 10, 1828, a state convention of Adams men met at Albany, and nominated U.S. President John Quincy Adams for re-election.

On July 22, a state convention of Adams men met at Utica; James Fairlie was Chairman; and Tilly Lynde and Thomas Clowes were Secretaries. They nominated U.S. Supreme Court Justice Smith Thompson for governor, and Assemblyman Francis Granger for lieutenant governor.

The Anti-Masonic state convention nominated Assemblyman Francis Granger for governor, and State Senator John Crary for lieutenant governor. Granger declined to run for this office on this ticket, and expected Crary to decline too, so that he, Granger, could be endorsed by the Anti-Masons for lieutenant governor. Crary, however, did not decline and ran on the Anti-Masonic ticket with Solomon Southwick for governor.

The Jacksonian state convention met at Herkimer and nominated U.S. Senator Martin Van Buren for governor and Circuit Judge Enos T. Throop for lieutenant governor.

At the time of the election in November 1828, there were three political parties: the "Jacksonians" (supporting the election of Andrew Jackson for U.S. president; led by U.S. Senator Martin Van Buren), the "Adams men" (supporters of the re-election of President John Quincy Adams), and the "Anti-Masons". After the defeat of Adams, the Adams men became known as "Anti-Jacksonians".

Elections
The State election was held from November 3 to 5, 1828. Martin Van Buren and Enos T. Throop were elected governor and lieutenant governor. 18 presidential electors for Andrew Jackson, and 16 for John Quincy Adams were elected in the congressional districts; and they co-opted another 2 Jacksonian electors-at-large.

Stephen Allen (1st D.), Samuel Rexford (2nd D.), Lewis Eaton (3rd D.), John McLean Jr. (4th D.), William H. Maynard (5th D.), John F. Hubbard (6th D.), Hiram F. Mather (7th D.) and Moses Hayden (8th D.) were elected to full terms in the Senate. George H. Boughton (8th D.) was elected to fill the vacancy. McLean was an Adams man; Maynard, Mather, Boughton and Hayden were Anti-Masons; the other four were Jacksonians.

Sessions
The Legislature met for the regular session at the Old State Capitol in Albany on January 6, 1829; and adjourned on May 5.

Peter Robinson (J) was elected Speaker.

On January 15, the Legislature elected Charles E. Dudley (J) to the seat in the U.S. Senate vacated by Martin Van Buren after his election as governor.

On January 27, the Legislature re-elected Secretary of State Azariah C. Flagg, Surveyor General Simeon De Witt, and State Treasurer Abraham Keyser, Jr.; and elected Congressman Silas Wright, Jr. to succeed William L. Marcy as State Comptroller; and Greene C. Bronson to succeed Samuel A. Talcott as attorney general.

On March 12, Gov. Martin Van Buren resigned to take office as U.S. Secretary of State, Lt. Gov. Enos T. Throop succeeded to the governorship, and Charles Stebbins (J) was elected Temporary President of the State Senate.

On April 2, the Legislature enacted the Bank Safety Fund Law which, among other things, created the office of Bank Commissioner.

On April 15, the Legislature enacted that henceforth the presidential electors should be elected statewide by general ticket, instead of in single districts.

State Senate

Districts
 The First District (4 seats) consisted of Kings, New York, Queens, Richmond and Suffolk counties.
 The Second District (4 seats) consisted of Delaware, Dutchess, Orange, Putnam, Rockland, Sullivan, Ulster and Westchester counties.
 The Third District (4 seats) consisted of Albany, Columbia, Greene, Rensselaer, Schenectady and Schoharie counties.
 The Fourth District (4 seats) consisted of Clinton, Essex, Franklin, Hamilton, Montgomery, St. Lawrence, Saratoga, Warren and Washington counties.
 The Fifth District (4 seats) consisted of Herkimer, Jefferson, Lewis, Madison, Oneida and Oswego counties.
 The Sixth District (4 seats) consisted of Broome, Chenango, Cortland, Otsego, Steuben, Tioga and Tompkins counties.
 The Seventh District (4 seats) consisted of Cayuga, Onondaga, Ontario, Seneca, Wayne and Yates counties.
 The Eighth District (4 seats) consisted of Allegany, Cattaraugus, Chautauqua, Erie, Genesee, Livingston, Monroe, Niagara and Orleans counties.

Note: There are now 62 counties in the State of New York. The counties which are not mentioned in this list had not yet been established, or sufficiently organized, the area being included in one or more of the abovementioned counties.

Members
The asterisk (*) denotes members of the previous Legislature who continued in office as members of this Legislature.

Employees
 Clerk: John F. Bacon

State Assembly

Districts

 Albany County (3 seats)
 Allegany County (1 seat)
 Broome County (1 seat)
 Cattaraugus County (1 seat)
 Cayuga County (4 seats)
 Chautauqua County (2 seats)
 Chenango County (3 seats)
 Clinton County (1 seat)
 Columbia County (3 seats)
 Cortland County (2 seats)
 Delaware County (2 seats)
 Dutchess County (4 seats)
 Erie County (2 seats)
 Essex County (1 seat)
 Franklin County (1 seat)
 Genesee County (3 seats)
 Greene County (2 seats)
 Hamilton and Montgomery counties (3 seats)
 Herkimer County (3 seats)
 Jefferson County (3 seats)
 Kings County (1 seat)
 Lewis County (1 seat)
 Livingston County (2 seats)
 Madison County (3 seats)
 Monroe County (3 seats)
 The City and County of New York (11 seats)
 Niagara County (1 seat)
 Oneida County (5 seats)
 Onondaga County (4 seats)
 Ontario County (3 seats)
 Orange County (3 seats)
 Orleans County (1 seat)
 Oswego County (1 seat)
 Otsego County (4 seats)
 Putnam County (1 seat)
 Queens County (1 seat)
 Rensselaer County (4 seats)
 Richmond County (1 seat)
 Rockland County (1 seat)
 St. Lawrence County (2 seats)
 Saratoga County (3 seats)
 Schenectady County (1 seat)
 Schoharie County (2 seats)
 Seneca County (2 seats)
 Steuben County (2 seats)
 Suffolk County (2 seats)
 Sullivan County (1 seat)
 Tioga County (2 seats)
 Tompkins County (3 seats)
 Ulster County (2 seats)
 Warren County (1 seat)
 Washington (3 seats)
 Wayne County (2 seats)
 Westchester County (3 seats)
 Yates County (1 seat)

Note: There are now 62 counties in the State of New York. The counties which are not mentioned in this list had not yet been established, or sufficiently organized, the area being included in one or more of the abovementioned counties.

Assemblymen
The asterisk (*) denotes members of the previous Legislature who continued as members of this Legislature.

Employees
 Clerk: Francis Seger
 Sergeant-at-Arms: John C. Ellis
 Doorkeeper: James D. Scollard
 Assistant Doorkeeper: Alonzo Crosby

Notes

Sources
 The New York Civil List compiled by Franklin Benjamin Hough (Weed, Parsons and Co., 1858) [see pg. 38f for Safety Fund and bank commissioners; pg. 109 and 441 for Senate districts; pg. 127f for senators; pg. 148f for Assembly districts; pg. 207ff for assemblymen; 322 and 327 for presidential election]
 The History of Political Parties in the State of New-York, from the Ratification of the Federal Constitution to 1840 by Jabez D. Hammond (4th ed., Vol. 2, Phinney & Co., Buffalo, 1850; pg. 288 to 315)

052
1829 in New York (state)
1829 U.S. legislative sessions